This is a list of radio stations that operate and broadcast from the state of Zacatecas.

Fresnillo, Zac. 

Amplitude Modulation

Frecuency Modulation

Jalpa, Zac. 

Amplitude Modulation

Frequency Modulation

Jerez de García Salinas, Zac. 

Frequency Modulation

Rio Grande, Zac. 

Frequency Modulation

Tlaltenango, Zac. 

Amplitude Modulation

Frequency Modulation

Zacatecas, Zac. 

Frequency Modulation

Closing stations 
All the AM stations that appear here requested their frequency change to broadcast on FM.

Fresnillo, Zac. 

Amplitude Modulation

Zacatecas, Zac. 

Amplitude Modulation

Defunct formats

Fresnillo, Zac. 

Amplitude Modulation

Data before the AM station starts FM broadcasts.

Frequency Modulation

Zacatecas